The VM was an experimental Soviet diesel-electric locomotive named after Vyacheslav Molotov (Russian: Вячеслав Молотов). It was a two-unit machine of 2-Do-1+1-Do-2 wheel arrangement and only one pair of locomotives was built.

Powertrain
The two diesel engines were of the six cylinder, four stroke type. They were Soviet-built and based on the MAN engine used in the Soviet E el-5 locomotive.

References

Railway locomotives introduced in 1934
VM
5 ft gauge locomotives